The Unemployment Compensation Extension Act of 2010 is an American law that was signed into law by President Barack Obama in July 2010.  It extends the filing period for unemployment benefits for Americans affected to the serious economic recession of 2007 until November 2010.

References

Unemployment in the United States
United States federal welfare and public assistance legislation
Acts of the 111th United States Congress